Dead American Radio is a studio album by US-punk-band Left Alone, released in 2006. The song "Dead American Radio" is in Tony Hawk's Downhill Jam.

Track listing
All songs written by Elvis Cortez unless otherwise noted.
 "The Sinner" – 2:51
 "City To City" (Elvis Cortez, Tim Armstrong) – 3:14
 "Every Night" – 3:28
 "Done Wrong" – 2:14
 "La Pregunta" (Elvis Cortez, Patricia Day) – 2:57
 "Waiting For You" – 3:35
 "Drunk Again" – 2:29
 "New York City" – 2:18
 "4 Weeks" – 2:50
 "She's The Only One" – 2:56
 "Wash Away" – 2:06
 "Bastard Son" – 2:06
 "Justino" – 3:29
 "Dead American Radio" – 3:03
 "No One Likes Us" – 2:38
 "I Hate Emo" – 1:34

References 

2006 albums
Left Alone albums